The McGowen ministry was the 34th ministry of the New South Wales Government, and was led by the 18th Premier, James McGowen. This ministry marks the first Labor ministry in the state of New South Wales.

McGowen was elected to the New South Wales Legislative Assembly in 1891, serving until 1917, before being appointed to the Legislative Council. He succeeded in defeating the government of Charles Wade at the 1910 state election and was commissioned to form government by Lord Chelmsford, Governor of New South Wales.

In March 1911 Walter Bevan, a public servant employed as a Crown prosecutor, was appointed Solicitor General, however he was not a member of parliament, nor was this a cabinet role. In April 1912 David Hall resigned his seat in the House or Representatives was appointed to the Legislative Council and as Minister of Justice on 2 April 1912. It was initially intended that Bevan would retain his role as Solicitor General, however two days later however Hall was appointed to replace Bevan in the role.

The ministry covers the period from 21 October 1910 until 29 June 1913, when McGowen resigned due to his health and misjudgment in attempting to settle a gasworkers strike and was succeeded by his deputy, William Holman.

Composition of ministry

The composition of the ministry was announced by Premier McGowen on 21 October 1910.

Ministers were members of the Legislative Assembly unless otherwise noted.

See also

Notes

References

 

New South Wales ministries
1910 establishments in Australia
1913 disestablishments in Australia
Australian Labor Party ministries in New South Wales